Vic Taylor (23 October 1922 – 4 February 2015) was an Australian rules footballer who played with Geelong in the Victorian Football League (VFL).

Notes

External links 

2015 deaths
1922 births
Australian rules footballers from Victoria (Australia)
Geelong Football Club players
North Geelong Football Club players